The 2010–11 PBA Philippine Cup Finals was the best-of-7 championship series of the 2010–11 PBA Philippine Cup, and the conclusion of the conference's playoffs. The Talk 'N Text Tropang Texters and the San Miguel Beermen played for the 101st championship contested by the league. Talk 'N Text won the series, 4–2, capturing their 3rd overall title.

Background

Road to the finals

Series summary

Game 1

Game 2

Game 3

Game 4

Game 5

Game 6

Rosters

Broadcast notes

References

External links
PBA official website

2010–11 PBA season
2011
PBA Philippine Cup Finals
San Miguel Beermen games
TNT Tropang Giga games
PBA Philippine Cup Finals
PBA Philippine Cup Finals